In quantum field theory a product of quantum fields, or equivalently their creation and annihilation operators, is usually said to be normal ordered (also called Wick order) when all creation operators are to the left of all annihilation operators in the product. The process of putting a product into normal order is called normal ordering (also called Wick ordering). The terms antinormal order and antinormal ordering are analogously defined, where the annihilation operators are placed to the left of the creation operators.

Normal ordering of a product quantum fields or creation and annihilation operators can also be defined in many other ways.  Which definition is most appropriate depends on the expectation values needed for a given calculation.  Most of this article uses the most common definition of normal ordering as given above, which is appropriate when taking expectation values using the vacuum state of the creation and annihilation operators.

The process of normal ordering is particularly important for a quantum mechanical Hamiltonian. When quantizing a classical Hamiltonian there is some freedom when choosing the operator order, and these choices lead to differences in the ground state energy.

Notation

Note that normal ordering is a concept that only makes sense for products of operators.  Attempting to apply normal ordering to a sum of operators is not useful as normal ordering is not a linear operation.

Bosons

Bosons are particles which satisfy Bose–Einstein statistics. We will now examine the normal ordering of bosonic creation and annihilation operator products.

Single bosons
If we start with only one type of boson there are two operators of interest:

 : the boson's creation operator.
 : the boson's annihilation operator.

These satisfy the commutator relationship

where  denotes the commutator. We may rewrite the last one as:

Examples
1. We'll consider the simplest case first. This is the normal ordering of :

The expression  has not been changed because it is already in normal order - the creation operator  is already to the left of the annihilation operator .

2. A more interesting example is the normal ordering of : 

or

This equation is used in defining the contractions used in Wick's theorem.

3. An example with multiple operators is:

4. A simple example shows that normal ordering cannot be extended by linearity from the monomials to all operators in a self-consistent way:

The implication is that normal ordering is not a linear function on operators.

Multiple bosons
If we now consider  different bosons there are  operators:
 : the  boson's creation operator.
 : the  boson's annihilation operator.
Here .

These satisfy the commutation relations:

where  and  denotes the Kronecker delta.

These may be rewritten as:

Examples
1. For two different bosons we have

2. For three different bosons we have

Notice that since (by the commutation relations)  the order in which we write the annihilation operators does not matter.

Bosonic operator functions
Normal ordering of bosonic operator functions , with occupation number operator , can be accomplished using (falling) factorial powers  and Newton series instead of Taylor series: 
It is easy to show 
 
that factorial powers  are equal to normal-ordered (raw) powers  and are therefore normal ordered by construction,

 

such that the Newton series expansion 

 

As a consequence, the normal-ordered Taylor series of an arbitrary function  is equal to the Newton series of an associated function , fulfilling

 

 

 

which can be expressed in terms of the Mellin transform , see  for details.

Fermions

Fermions are particles which satisfy Fermi–Dirac statistics. We will now examine the normal ordering of fermionic creation and annihilation operator products.

Single fermions
For a single fermion there are two operators of interest:

 : the fermion's creation operator.
 : the fermion's annihilation operator.

These satisfy the anticommutator relationships

where  denotes the anticommutator. These may be rewritten as

To define the normal ordering of a product of fermionic creation and annihilation operators we must take into account the number of interchanges between neighbouring operators. We get a minus sign for each such interchange.

Examples
1. We again start with the simplest cases:

This expression is already in normal order so nothing is changed. In the reverse case, we introduce a minus sign because we have to change the order of two operators:

These can be combined, along with the anticommutation relations, to show

or

This equation, which is in the same form as the bosonic case above, is used in defining the contractions used in Wick's theorem.

2. The normal order of any more complicated cases gives zero because there will be at least one creation or annihilation operator appearing twice. For example:

Multiple fermions
For  different fermions there are  operators:
 : the  fermion's creation operator.
 : the  fermion's annihilation operator.
Here .

These satisfy the anti-commutation relations:

where  and  denotes the Kronecker delta.

These may be rewritten as:

When calculating the normal order of products of fermion operators we must take into account the number of interchanges of neighbouring operators required to rearrange the expression. It is as if we pretend the creation and annihilation operators anticommute and then we reorder the expression to ensure the creation operators are on the left and the annihilation operators are on the right - all the time taking account of the anticommutation relations.

Examples
1. For two different fermions we have

Here the expression is already normal ordered so nothing changes.

Here we introduce a minus sign because we have interchanged the order of two operators.

Note that the order in which we write the operators here, unlike in the bosonic case, does matter.

2. For three different fermions we have

Notice that since (by the anticommutation relations)  the order in which we write the operators does matter in this case.

Similarly we have

Uses in quantum field theory

The vacuum expectation value of a normal ordered product of creation and annihilation operators is zero.

Let  denote a non-empty product of creation and annihilation operators. Although this may satisfy

we have

Normal ordered operators are particularly useful when defining a quantum mechanical Hamiltonian. If the Hamiltonian of a theory is in normal order then the ground state energy will be zero:
.

Free fields
With two free fields φ and χ,

where  is again the vacuum state. Each of the two terms on the right hand side typically blows up in the limit as y approaches x but the difference between them has a well-defined limit. This allows us to define :φ(x)χ(x):.

Wick's theorem

Wick's theorem states the relationship between the time ordered product of  fields and a sum of 
normal ordered products. This may be expressed for  even as

where the summation is over all the distinct ways in which one may pair up fields. The result for  odd looks the same
except for the last line which reads

This theorem provides a simple method for computing vacuum expectation values of time ordered products of operators and was the motivation behind the introduction of normal ordering.

Alternative definitions

The most general definition of normal ordering involves splitting all quantum fields into two parts (for example see Evans and Steer 1996)
.  
In a product of fields, the fields are split into the two parts and the  parts are moved so as to be always to the left of all the  parts.  In the usual case considered in the rest of the article, the  contains only creation operators, while the  contains only annihilation operators.  As this is a mathematical identity, one can split fields in any way one likes.  However, for this to be a useful procedure one demands that the normal ordered product of any combination of fields has zero expectation value

These two properties means that we can apply Wick's theorem in the usual way, turning expectation values of time-ordered products of fields into products of c-number pairs, the contractions. In this generalised setting, the contraction is defined to be the difference between the time-ordered product and the normal ordered product of a pair of fields.

The simplest example is found in the context of Thermal quantum field theory (Evans and Steer 1996). For instance, for a single bosonic quantum harmonic oscillator we have that the thermal expectation value of the number operator is simply the Bose–Einstein distribution

So here the number operator  is normal ordered in the usual sense used in the rest of the article yet its thermal expectation values are non-zero. Applying Wick's theorem and doing calculation with the usual normal ordering in this thermal context is possible but computationally impractical. The combinations are chosen to ensure that the thermal expectation values of normal ordered products are always zero so the split chosen will depend on the temperature.

References

 F. Mandl, G. Shaw, Quantum Field Theory, John Wiley & Sons, 1984.
 S. Weinberg, The Quantum Theory of Fields (Volume I) Cambridge University Press (1995)
 T.S. Evans, D.A. Steer, Wick's theorem at finite temperature, Nucl. Phys B 474, 481-496 (1996) arXiv:hep-ph/9601268

Quantum field theory